Thunder River is a river entirely within the Grand Canyon National Park. It flows southeast from its source near the North Rim of the canyon to Tapeats Creek. It is also a rare instance where a river is a tributary of a creek.

History
While Tapeats Creek was named by the second Powell Expedition in the winter of 1871–1872, the expedition did not discover Thunder River; European-American discovery of the river did not occur until 1904. The river can be reached by Thunder River Trail from the North Rim, which is only accessible from mid-May to late October. The upper portions of the trail were originally built in 1876 when rumors of placer gold led speculators to need a way into the area. Further trail work was performed beginning in 1925 under the US Forest Service and continued under the National Park Service with the final sections to Tapeats Creek completed in 1939.

Source
The creek is fed from Thunder Spring, the second-largest spring on the North Rim. Since the spring flows year round, the river is a perennial river. In 1970, the spring was estimated to discharge  of water per day into the river.

Environment
Common trees near the spring include Fremont's cottonwoods and white sumac.  Along the river are willows, seepwillows, other shrubs, crimson monkeyflower, maidenhair fern and other riparian fauna.  Common aquatic invertebrate found in the creek include stoneflies and caddisflies.

See also

 List of rivers of Arizona
 Wallkill River, in New Jersey and New York, also drains into a creek.

Notes

References

Rivers of Arizona
Tributaries of the Colorado River in Arizona
Rivers of Coconino County, Arizona
Grand Canyon, North Rim
Grand Canyon, North Rim (west)